The men's 4 × 400 metres relay was an event at the 1956 Summer Olympics in Melbourne, Australia. There were fifteen nations competing.

Final classification

References

External links
 Official Report
 Results

M
Relay foot races at the Olympics
Men's events at the 1956 Summer Olympics